The Military Academy of the Azerbaijani Armed Forces translated into English as the War College of the Azerbaijani Armed Forces  is an academic institution of the Azerbaijani Armed Forces. It is seniormost military academy of its kind in the military of Azerbaijan, training senior military officers and personnel to develop their military professions and their leadership skills. The War College was established by decree of President Heydar Aliyev on February 20, 1999, in order to provide an effective training courses for post-secondary military education. Students at the War College receive a two-year education which focuses on command positions and tactical or operational levels. Lieutenant General Heydar Piriyev is one of the more recent and notable graduates of the war college and the current rector of the college.

Courses
 Military diplomacy 
 Military economics 
 Military politics
 Foreign languages 
 English
 German
 French
 Persian
 Armenian
 Russian

Chiefs 
 Major General Najaf Gambarov (-18 November 2013)
 Major General Altay Mehdiyev (18 November 2013-June 2014)
 Lieutenant General Heydar Piriyev (since June 2014)

Alumni
 Lieutenant General Karim Valiyev (class of 2006), Chief of Main Department for Personnel
 Colonel Ilgar Mirzayev (class of 1995), an artillery chief serving in the 3rd Army Corps until his death during the July 2020 Armenian–Azerbaijani clashes.

See also 

 Vazgen Sargsyan Military University
 National Defense Academy (Georgia)
 List of universities in Azerbaijan

References

Military academies of Azerbaijan
Universities and colleges in Azerbaijan
Educational institutions established in 1992
1992 establishments in Azerbaijan
War colleges